The City in Europe and the World is a 2005 collection of essays examining the relationship between the City of London's financial markets, politics, government, and Europe, edited by Stephen Barber and with a foreword by Peter Mandelson.

The book covers topics such as the political economy of the city, the Lisbon strategy, the Financial Services Action Plan (FSAP), the euro, relations between the city and party politics, PFI, foreign exchange, regulation, ethics, financial exclusion, European expansion, globalisation and the future of the City in Europe, the book addresses some of the major issues facing today's political economy.

Contributions from: Graham Bishop, Alex Brassey, Mario Cerrato, Patrick Diamond, Brendan Donnelly, Howard Flight, Alexandra Forter, Chris Huhne, Mario Jung, Angela Knight, Peter Mandelson, Agnes Oestrich, Giancarlo Perasso, Alice Rogers, Sanjiv Sachdev, L.V. Spagnolo, Richard Woodward.

2005 non-fiction books
Economy of London
City of London
British books
Books about economic history